The Cabonga Reservoir is a man-made lake in central Quebec, Canada, with a total surface area of  and a net area (water only) of . It is located on the boundary between the unorganized territories of Lac-Pythonga and Réservoir-Dozois, and fully within the La Vérendrye Wildlife Reserve. The First Nations reserve of Rapide Lake is on its western shores.

Its name is derived from the Algonquin kakibonga and means "completely blocked by sand."

The reservoir has two outlets: the Gens de Terre River flowing to the south-east which is a tributary of the Baskatong Reservoir and Gatineau River; and an outflow to the north-west flowing directly into Barrière Lake which is part of the Ottawa River system. Both outflows are controlled by dams to regulate the flow on the respective rivers.

Many fishing magazines and websites consider Cabonga Reservoir one of North America's top 20 walleye and northern pike waters. Also, Outdoor Canada magazine includes it among its "simply the best" hot spots for lake trout fishing.

History
Before its impoundment, Lake Cabonga was considered the largest body of water between the Gatineau and Ottawa Rivers. In 1851, the Hudson's Bay Company established a trading post at this lake (named Kakabonga at that time). The post burned down in 1873, and was not rebuilt but replaced by a new post on Barrière Lake. In 1928-1929, a dam at the outlet of the lake, the Gens de Terre River, was constructed to create a water reserve for logging companies to float their logs downstream.

Surveyor H. C. Symmes, in a report dating from 1864, used "Kakibonga" to designate the lake. In 1911, one map named it "Lake Kakabonga". Finally in 1924, the Commission de Géographie approved its current name.

Fauna
Fish species found in the lake are: lake trout, yellow walleye, northern pike, lake sturgeon, lake whitefish, sauger, white sucker, and yellow perch.

See also
Zec Capitachouane
Dozois Reservoir, nearby large reservoir downstream on the Ottawa River

References

Reservoirs in Quebec
Lakes of Abitibi-Témiscamingue
Lakes of Outaouais